The Wartime Treatment Study Act is federal U.S. legislation which would examine the treatment of European Americans, European Latin Americans, and Jewish refugees during World War II in America. Lead sponsors include Russ Feingold and Charles Grassley. The bill passed in the U.S. Senate in 2007, and in the House Judiciary Subcommittee on Immigration, Citizenship, Refugees, Border Security, and International Law in 2009 but did not become law.

Reactions

Critics from the U.S. Holocaust Memorial Museum argue the legislation is exaggerated despite contradictory findings.

References

External links
Full text of legislation

Proposed legislation of the 111th United States Congress